The Cuba women's national under-16 and under-17 basketball team is a national basketball team of Cuba, administered by the Federación Cubana de Baloncesto.

It represents the country in international under-16 and under-17 (under age 16 and under age 17) women's basketball competitions.

See also
Cuba women's national basketball team
Cuba women's national under-19 basketball team
Cuba men's national under-17 basketball team

References

External links
 Archived records of Cuba team participations

U-17
Women's national under-17 basketball teams
Basketball